The Jaipur–Alwar Express is an Express train belonging to North Western Railway zone that runs between  and  in India. It operates with 14807/14808 train numbers on a daily basis.

Service

The 14807/Jaipur–Alwar Express has an average speed of 52 km/hr and covers 151 km in 2h 55m. The 14808/Alwar–Jaipur Express has an average speed of 44 km/hr and covers 151 km in 3h 25m.

Route and halts 

The important halts of the train are:

Coach composition

The train has standard ICF rakes with max speed of 110 kmph. The train consists of 16 coaches:

 1 Chair Car
 13 General Unreserved
 2 Seating cum Luggage Rake

Traction

Both trains are hauled by a Ratlam Loco Shed-based WDM-3A diesel locomotive from Jaipur to Alwar and vice versa.

Rake sharing

The train shares its rake with

 54809/54810 Rewari–Jodhpur Passenger
 54835/54836 Jaipur–Hisar Passenger
 54833/54834 Hisar–Rewari Passenger

See also 

 Alwar Junction railway station
 Jammu Tawi railway station
 Rewari–Jodhpur Passenger
 Jaipur–Hisar Passenger
 Hisar–Rewari Passenger

Notes

References

External links 

 14807/Jaipur - Alwar Express
 14808/Alwar - Jaipur Express

Transport in Jaipur
Rail transport in Rajasthan
Railway services introduced in 2013
Express trains in India